Don Bichel (4 May 1935 – 11 October 2004) was an Australian cricketer. He played in three first-class matches for Queensland between 1963 and 1965.

See also
 List of Queensland first-class cricketers

References

External links
 

1935 births
2004 deaths
Australian cricketers
Queensland cricketers
Cricketers from Queensland